Ruthenian Catholic Church may refer to:

 Ruthenian Uniate Church, a historical Eastern Catholic jurisdiction during the early modern period
 Belarusian Greek Catholic Church, representing modern branch of the Ruthenian Uniate Church, in Belarus
 Ukrainian Greek Catholic Church, representing modern branch of the Ruthenian Uniate Church, in Ukraine
 Ruthenian Greek Catholic Church, the formal name of an Eastern Catholic, Byzantine rite church, currently operating in Carpathian Ruthenia (western Ukraine), the United States, and the Czech Republic

See also
 Ruthenian Orthodox Church (disambiguation)